Evan James Moore (born January 3, 1985) is a former American football tight end in the National Football League (NFL) and current TV football analyst. He was signed by the Green Bay Packers as an undrafted free agent in 2008 out of Stanford University. He played college football and college basketball at Stanford.  He is currently a college football analyst at Pac-12 Network and FOX Sports.

Early years
Moore attended Brea Olinda High School in Orange County, California and was an All-American in both football and basketball.  He led his basketball team with 24.5 points per game and his football team with 13 touchdowns his senior year.  He was named the "Orange County Athlete of the Year" for his performance in the athletic arena. Other notable recipients of this award include Tony Gonzalez (Atlanta Falcons) and DeShaun Foster (Carolina Panthers).  His high school career propelled him into a position to play both football and basketball on a full scholarship at Stanford University. He chose Stanford over USC and UCLA.

College career
At Stanford, Moore was the starting wide receiver for 3 years. He had a breakout sophomore season, leading his team in touchdown receptions. The following year (his junior season) he suffered a serious injury, a dislocated hip, which sidelined him for the entire season.  He was able to receive a medical redshirt for his junior season. At Stanford, Moore graduated with a bachelor's degree in Political Science and a master's degree in Business and Organizational Behavior.

Moore also played basketball for two years at Stanford University.

Professional career

Green Bay Packers
Moore went undrafted in the 2008 NFL Draft. He was first signed with the New Orleans Saints, later being cut by head coach Sean Payton during training camp. On May 22, 2008 Moore signed with the Green Bay Packers. He was placed on the injured reserve list after sustaining a knee injury in a game against the San Francisco 49ers.

Cleveland Browns
Moore was signed to the Cleveland Browns practice squad on November 9, 2009 once he recovered from a broken hand suffered in training camp with the Green Bay Packers. He was promoted to the active roster December 5. In Moore's NFL debut against the San Diego Chargers, he caught 6 passes for 80 yards and was the team's leading receiver on the day.  After playing in only 5 regular season games with the Cleveland Browns in 2009, Moore led all tight ends in receptions and yards on the season and was among the team's top receiving targets.  He followed this up with a solid 2010 season, leading the Browns with just over 22 yards per reception.  Following this 2010 season, Moore signed a 3-year deal reportedly worth just over $3 million per year.  In 2011, Moore led the Browns in touchdown receptions, and was once again one of the team's leading receiving targets.  He was released by the Browns on August 31, 2012.

Seattle Seahawks
Moore signed with the Seattle Seahawks on September 1, 2012 to an undisclosed contract. He was released December 19, 2012.

Philadelphia Eagles
On December 20, 2012, the day after being released by the Seahawks, Moore was signed by the Philadelphia Eagles. He was released on April 29, 2013 after undergoing surgery for a back injury.

NFL career statistics

Post-football career
Moore appeared on Sky Sports Network in London during the 2014-2015 NFL playoffs as a TV analyst. Shortly after, he appeared as a studio analyst for NBC's Pro Football Talk. In the fall of 2015, Moore made his FOX debut as a color commentator for the Oregon St. vs Oregon college football game. He recently called the game ranked as the 30th best of the 2018-19 season, BYU at Utah.

Personal life

His brother-in-law, Chase Lyman, played WR at the University of California and the New Orleans Saints.

References

External links

 Stanford Cardinal bio

1985 births
Living people
People from Brea, California
Players of American football from California
American football tight ends
American football wide receivers
Basketball players from California
Stanford Cardinal football players
Stanford Cardinal men's basketball players
Green Bay Packers players
Cleveland Browns players
Seattle Seahawks players
Sportspeople from Orange County, California
Philadelphia Eagles players
Small forwards
Power forwards (basketball)
American men's basketball players